The Egyptian General Petroleum Corporation (EGPC) is a national oil company of Egypt. EGPC's business includes crude oil exploration, refining, and storage. The company also produces lubricants and greases and offers services for oil and gas projects.

History
The company was established in 1956 with its headquarters in Cairo. At the foundation stage it was named General Petroleum Authority. It was renamed as Egyptian General Petroleum Corporation in 1962. In February 2018 EGPC partnered with Israel-based company Noble and Delek in a venture called EMED to acquire a 39% stake in the East Mediterranean Gas Company. As director of the majority partner in EMED serves former chairman of EGPC Mohammed Shoeib. In 2020 EGPC announced to license about 60 new fuel across Egypt. The company also announced its plans to invest EGP 379 million to build fuel stations and warehouse storage. Currently Abed Ezz El Regal serves as CEO of EGPC.

Structure
EGPC owns 70% of shares in the Egyptian Natural Gas Company, as well as a 75% stake in the petroleum-industry support airline Petroleum Air Services (the remaining 25% being held by the British firm Bristow Group). In 2018 the company had 2,000 employees.

Chief executives
 Mahmoud Younis (May 16, 1956 – October 14, 1956)
 Fathi Rizk (October 14, 1956 – May 19, 1959)
 Aziz Sedky (May 19, 1959 – December 25, 1961)
 Ahmed Kamel Al-Badri (December 25, 1961 – November 2, 1966)
 Hassan Amer (November 2, 1966 – September 13, 1967)
 Muhammad Halim (September 13, 1967 – May 23, 1968)
 Ali Waly (May 23, 1968 – October 4, 1971)
 Ahmad Ezz El-Din Hilal (October 4, 1971 – April 1, 1973)
 Muhammad Ramzi al-Laithi (April 1, 1973 – October 11, 1983)
 Abd al-Hadi Qandil (October 11, 1983 – August 3, 1987)
 Muhammad Ma’bad (August 3, 1987 – November 10, 1988)
 Hamdi Al-Banabi (November 10, 1988 – May 23, 1991)
 Mustafa Shaarawi (May 23, 1991 – May 11, 1996)
 Abd al-Khaliq Ayyad (May 11, 1996 – June 16, 2000)
 Muhammad Tawileh (June 16, 2000 – August 7, 2001)
 Ibrahim Saleh (August 7, 2001 – July 9, 2006)
 Abdel-Alim Taha (July 9, 2006 – February 2, 2010)
 Abdullah Ghorab (February 2, 2010 – March 20, 2011)
 Hani Dahi (March 20, 2011 – December 31, 2012)
 Sherif Haddara (January 1, 2013 – May 19, 2013)
 Tariq Al-Baratawi (May 19, 2013 – August 22, 2013)
 Tariq Al-Mulla (August 22, 2013 – October 15, 2015)
 Muhammad al-Masry (October 15, 2015 – April 7, 2016)
 Tariq Al-Hadidi (April 7, 2016 – March 14, 2017)
 Abed Ezz El-Regal (March 14, 2017 – January 28, 2022)
 Alaa El Batal (January 28, 2022 – Present)

See also

 Energy in Egypt

References

External links
Official website

Oil and gas companies of Egypt
National oil and gas companies
Companies based in Cairo
Energy companies established in 1956
Non-renewable resource companies established in 1956
Egyptian brands
Government-owned companies of Egypt
Egyptian companies established in 1956